"Sleigh Ride" is a light orchestra standard composed by Leroy Anderson. The composer had formed the original idea for the piece during a heat wave in July 1946, and he finished the work in February 1948. The original recordings were instrumental versions. The lyrics, about riding in a sleigh and other fun wintertime activities, were written by Mitchell Parish in 1950. Anderson also made arrangements for wind band and piano.

The orchestral version was first recorded in 1949 by Arthur Fiedler and the Boston Pops Orchestra. "Sleigh Ride" was a hit record on RCA Victor Red Seal, and has become one of the orchestra's signature songs. The 45 rpm version was originally issued on red vinyl. The Pops have also recorded the song with John Williams, their conductor from 1979 to 1995, and Keith Lockhart, their current conductor.

The Ronettes recorded a cover of "Sleigh Ride" in 1963 for Phil Spector's A Christmas Gift for You, which was commercially successful in the United States and featured in various media.

Details

Leroy Anderson's own 1950 recording of "Sleigh Ride" on Decca reached Cashbox's bestsellers' chart when re-released in 1952.

The main melody of "Sleigh Ride" was used, but without crediting Anderson, as the main theme of Victor Young's score for the 1949 Western Streets of Laredo. Mitchell Parish worked with Young at this approximate time, writing the lyrics for Young's version of Hoagy Carmichael's previously instrumental "Stardust." In 1950, The Andrews Sisters recorded the first vocal version of "Sleigh Ride", using the lyrics Parish had written. Although "Sleigh Ride" is often associated with Christmas and appears on Christmas compilation albums, its lyrics do not mention any holidays. (Certain recordings, such as those by the Carpenters, Walter Schumann, and Air Supply, substitute "Christmas party" instead of "birthday party" in the song's bridge.) 

The piece is noted for the sounds of a horse clip-clopping, and a whip used to get the horse moving. In most performances, a percussionist provides these sounds on temple blocks and a slapstick, respectively. Toward the end of the piece, a trumpet imitates the sound of a horse whinnying.

According to the American Society of Composers, Authors and Publishers (ASCAP), "Sleigh Ride" consistently ranks as one of the top 10 most-performed songs written by ASCAP members. ASCAP named "Sleigh Ride" the most popular piece of Christmas music in the U.S. between 2009–2012 based on performance data from over 2,500 radio stations. Anderson's recording remains the most popular instrumental version, while Johnny Mathis's has become the most popular vocal version.

Steve Metcalf says "'Sleigh Ride'... has been performed and recorded by a wider array of musical artists than any other piece in the history of Western music."

"Sleigh Ride" is in seven-part rondo form. The first rondo episode utilizes an unusual, unprepared modulation to the mediant, then the supertonic.

The Ronettes version

"Sleigh Ride" was covered by the American girl group the Ronettes. The Phil Spector-produced recording has become the most popular version outside the traditional pop standard genre, charting yearly in Billboards Top Ten U.S. Holiday 100 and was #26 in 2018 in the Hot 100. After achieving a new peak of ten in 2021, it became the group's second-highest chart hit in the US after "Be My Baby". It features the well-known "Ring-a-ling-a-ling, ding-dong-ding" background vocals, and the clip-clop and whinny of a horse at its beginning and end. Both bridge sections were omitted from this version, leaving only the refrains intact.

Charts

Certifications and sales

Gwen Stefani version

Background and release 
Stefani released her fourth studio album, You Make It Feel Like Christmas through Interscope Records, on October 6, 2017, a collection of six original songs and six cover versions of Christmas standards. The album was preceded by the release of lead single "You Make It Feel Like Christmas", a duet with her boyfriend, American singer Blake Shelton. According to Stefani, the album's initial release generated a positive response, allowing her to return to the studio with collaborators busbee and Justin Tranter. The following year, You Make It Feel Like Christmas was reissued with five new bonus tracks and a proper music video for the title track was released.

In 2019, Stefani duetted with Shelton again on "Nobody but You", a new track recorded for his compilation album, Fully Loaded: God's Country. The song was released as a single and distributed to US country radio outlets on January 21, 2020. It became a hit, topping Billboards Country Airplay and Digital Songs charts and becoming Stefani's highest-charting effort on the Billboard Hot 100 since 2007. In late 2020, rumors of new solo music from Stefani circulated after it was announced she would be returning as a judge to the American television series The Voice. Stefani then confirmed plans to release new music during a promotional advertisement made for the show. Her cover of "Sleigh Ride" was announced as a surprise to her fans on October 12, 2020, the day before its scheduled release. It is expected to appear as the eighteenth track on an upcoming reissue of You Make It Feel Like Christmas, due for release later in 2020.

"Sleigh Ride" was produced by American musicians Brent Kutzle and Brandon Collins. It is the first track from You Make It Feel Like Christmas that was not produced by busbee or Eric Valentine; busbee had previously co-written all of the original songs on the parent album with Stefani and Tranter, but died in September 2019 after a battle with glioblastoma. Stefani's cover of "Sleigh Ride" credits Anderson and Parish as composers. The song was released to music retailers for digital download and streaming on October 13, 2020 through Interscope Records. A promotional audio video of the song was uploaded to Stefani's YouTube channel the same day of its release. It serves as first solo release since the rest of You Make It Feel Like Christmas. Alongside the release of "Sleigh Ride", Stefani teased that there was "more to come" the following week.

Composition 
Stefani's version of "Sleigh Ride" has been described as a holiday-themed song with a "lushly"-arranged orchestra. American musician, Ryan Tedder, contributes as a vocal producer of the song, and Stefani is accompanied by American singer Laura Cooksey for background vocals.

Critical reception 
Sophie Smith from the entertainment website uDiscover Music was positive about Stefani's cover, calling it a "cheery" and "festive" new track. A contributor to WSRW felt that Stefani got "in the holiday spirit" with her cover, but felt that it was released too early before the holiday season.

Credits and personnel 
Credits adapted from AllMusic.

 Gwen Stefaniprimary artist
 Brandon Collinsproducer, strings contractor
 Brent Kutzleproducer, keyboards
 Leroy Andersoncomposer
 Mitchell Parishcomposer
 Ryan Teddervocal producer
 John Nathanielvocal producer, mixing
 Grant Pittmanengineer, keyboards
 Doug Sarrettengineer
 Tyler Spryengineer
 Mike Wilsonengineer
 Chris Gehringermastering engineer
 Laura Cookseybackground vocals
 Luke Sullivantacoustic guitar, electric guitar
 Matt Meltonbass
 Paul Nelsoncello
 Jon Hyrkasdrums
 Betsy Lambviola, violin
 David Angellviolin
 David Davidsonviolin

Charts

Release history

Other recordings

 1949 – Arthur Fiedler and the Boston Pops. The original hit recording, this version has never been available on CD. Other Boston Pops recordings have been made under conductors Fiedler (1959, 1970, 1972, and 1976), John Williams (1991), and Keith Lockhart (1998, 2004, and 2011).
 1950 – Leroy Anderson. The Decca Gold Label Series singles (#16000, both 45 and 78 rpm) referenced above were not issued as individual records. Still, they were part of the four-disc set Leroy Anderson Conducts His Own Compositions. This version is played mostly during the holiday season and has appeared in various compilations. Anderson re-recorded "Sleigh Ride" in stereo for the 1959 Decca LP Leroy Anderson Conducts Leroy Anderson.
 1950 – The Andrews Sisters (the first vocal version)
 1958 – Johnny Mathis – Merry Christmas
 1959 - Andre Kostelanetz (as Andre Kostelanetz and His Orchestra) recorded his version in 1959. It appeared on his own 1963 "Wonderland of Christmas" LP.  This version could be found on several Christmas compilation albums sold throughout the 1960s and early 1970s at various drug stores, grocery stores (found on the 1970 A&P "Christmas Greetings Vol.1" compilation LP) and in Goodyear Tire and Rubber Company's tire stores (released in 1961 on "The Great Songs of Christmas Vol. 1" compilation LP).
 1960 – Ella Fitzgerald – Ella Wishes You a Swinging Christmas; this version was later featured in the 2003 film Elf.
 1965 – Andy Williams – Merry Christmas
 1965 - The Ventures arranged an instrumental version of the song in the style of their hit recording of "Walk: Don't Run!" and made it, "Sleigh-ride" the leadoff track on their popular LP, The Ventures Christmas Album.  It was also released as a Ventures 45RPM record and was then, still is, a mainstay in seasonal radio music. Later, at least two other popular versions that are inspired by The Ventures have been recorded, by Los Straitjackets, and by Jon and the Nightriders.
 1978 – The Carpenters – Christmas Portrait
 1983 – Amy Grant – A Christmas Album
 1987 – Air Supply – The Christmas Album 
 1993 – TLC recorded a version of the song for the 1992 film Home Alone 2: Lost in New York that was later included on the 1993 holiday album, A LaFace Family Christmas,  featuring them and other artists signed to the LaFace Records label. Their version features a rap written and performed by Lisa 'Left Eye' Lopes.
 1996 – Spice Girls recorded a version of the song, which appeared as a B-side for 2 Become 1 and also featured on the 1998 film, Jack Frost, soundtrack.
 2002 – S Club Juniors, the junior spin-off of S Club 7, released their version as part of a double-a-side with their version of Paul Anka's "Puppy Love". Reaching #6 in December of that year, it is still the only version of the song to have charted in the UK.
 2012 - Sufjan Stevens released a version of the song as part of the ninth volume of the Silver & Gold Christmas box set.
 2015 - Miley Cyrus and Bill Murray performed the song together in the Christmas musical comedy A Very Murray Christmas.
 2019 – Idina Menzel – Christmas: A Season of Love
 2020 - Tori Kelly – A Tori Kelly Christmas
 2020 - Meghan Trainor – A Very Trainor Christmas

Mariah Carey version 

In 2020, American singer-songwriter Mariah Carey recorded a cover of "Sleigh Ride" for her second soundtrack album, Mariah Carey's Magical Christmas Special (2020).

Charts

Ella Fitzgerald version

Charts

Certifications

References

External links 
 Sleigh Ride on the Leroy Anderson Foundation webpage
 Lyrics to Sleigh Ride 
 Performance by the United States Navy Band 

1948 songs
2020 singles
American Christmas songs
Articles containing video clips
Songs with lyrics by Mitchell Parish
Songs with music by Leroy Anderson
Air Supply songs
Amy Grant songs
Andy Williams songs
Ella Fitzgerald songs
Glen Campbell songs
Gwen Stefani songs
Johnny Mathis songs
Mariah Carey songs
Percy Faith songs
The Carpenters songs
The Ronettes songs
Song recordings produced by Phil Spector
Song recordings with Wall of Sound arrangements
Compositions in B-flat major
Philles Records singles
Interscope Records singles